Viera may refer to:

Places
Viera, Florida, a community in the United States
Viera, Piedmont, a subdivision in the municipality of Coggiola, province of Biella, Italy
The Dolmen de Viera or Dolmen de los Hermanos Viera, a type of single-chamber megalithic tomb in Antequera, Spain
Viera, a historical name of what now tends to be called Wyre, an island of the Orkney Islands, Scotland

People
Viera (given name)

 José de Viera y Clavijo (1731–1813), Spanish historian
 Feliciano Viera (1872–1927), President of Uruguay (1915–1919)
 Helvecia Viera (1928–2009), Chilean actress and comedian
 Ricardo Viera (1945-2020), Cuban artist 
 Sebastián Viera (born 1983), Uruguayan-born footballer
 Jonathan Viera (born 1989), Spanish footballer
 Gustavo Viera (Paraguayan footballer) (born 1995), Paraguayan football midfielder
 Gustavo Viera (Uruguayan footballer) (born 2000), Uruguayan football forward
 Santiago Viera (born 1998), Uruguayan footballer
 Tabaré Viera (born 1955), Uruguayan politician

Technology
VIERA, line of Panasonic LCD and plasma television sets
Ivanov ZJ-Viera, a Czech ultralight aircraft design
Viera Cast, multimedia technology by Panasonic

Other uses
Viera (Final Fantasy), a race in the Ivalice universe in the Final Fantasy video games franchise

See also
Vieira
Vieri (surname)